Syria competed in the Summer Olympic Games for the first time at the 1948 Summer Olympics in London, England.

Competitors
The following is the list of number of competitors in the Games.

Diving

References
Official Olympic Reports
 

Nations at the 1948 Summer Olympics
1948
Olympics, Summer